The 2000 NCAA Division I men's basketball tournament involved 64 schools playing in single-elimination play to determine the national champion of men's  NCAA Division I college basketball. It began on March 16, 2000, and ended with the championship game on April 3 in Indianapolis, Indiana at the RCA Dome. A total of 63 games were played.

Due to a string of upsets throughout the tournament, only one top-four seed advanced to the Final Four. That was Michigan State, who finished the season as the #2 team in the nation and was given the top seed in the Midwest Region. The highest seeded of the other three Final Four teams was Florida, who won the East Region as the fifth seed. Two eight-seeds made the Final Four, with Wisconsin and North Carolina rounding the bracket out. Wisconsin won the West Region while North Carolina won the South Region, with both regions seeing their top three seeds eliminated during the first weekend of play.

Michigan State won their first national championship since 1979 by defeating Florida 89–76 in the final game. Mateen Cleaves of Michigan State was named the tournament's Most Outstanding Player, while Morris Peterson was its leading scorer.

Despite the string of upsets, no seed lower than 11 won a game in the tournament. The only 11 seed to win was Pepperdine, which defeated Indiana in the East Region's first round in what turned out to be Bob Knight's last game coaching the Hoosiers before his firing that offseason. Also, two teams that qualified as 10 seeds advanced to the Sweet Sixteen as Seton Hall in the East and Gonzaga in the West both advanced.

Because of the upsets, the Elite Eight consisted of one top seed (Michigan State), one second seed (Iowa State), one third seed (Oklahoma State), one fifth seed (Florida), one sixth seed (Purdue), one seventh seed (Tulsa), and two eighth seeds (Wisconsin and North Carolina). This is the most recent title won by the Big Ten Conference.

Schedule and venues

The following are the sites that were selected to host each round of the 2000 tournament:

First and Second Rounds
March 16 and 18
Midwest Region
 CSU Convocation Center, Cleveland, Ohio (Host: Cleveland State University)
 Hubert H. Humphrey Metrodome, Minneapolis, Minnesota (Host: University of Minnesota)
West Region
 Jon M. Huntsman Center, Salt Lake City, Utah (Host: University of Utah)
 McKale Center, Tucson, Arizona (Host: University of Arizona)
March 17 and 19
East Region
 HSBC Arena, Buffalo, New York (Hosts: Canisius College, Niagara University, Metro Atlantic Athletic Conference)
 Lawrence Joel Veterans Memorial Coliseum, Winston-Salem, North Carolina (Host: Wake Forest University)
South Region
 BJCC Arena, Birmingham, Alabama (Host: Southeastern Conference)
 Gaylord Entertainment Center, Nashville, Tennessee (Host: Ohio Valley Conference)

Regional semifinals and finals (Sweet Sixteen and Elite Eight)
March 23 and 25
Midwest Regional, The Palace of Auburn Hills, Auburn Hills, Michigan (Host: Mid-American Conference)
West Regional, University Arena ("The Pit"), Albuquerque, New Mexico (Host: University of New Mexico)
March 24 and 26
East Regional, Carrier Dome, Syracuse, New York (Host: Syracuse University)
South Regional, Frank Erwin Center, Austin, Texas (Host: University of Texas at Austin)

National semifinals and championship (Final Four and championship)
April 1 and 3
RCA Dome, Indianapolis, Indiana (Hosts: Butler University, IUPUI)

For the third time in a decade, and fourth time overall, Indianapolis was the host city of the Final Four. The tournament saw one new host city and three new host venues included for the first time. The tournament came to Cleveland for the first time ever, hosted on the campus of Cleveland State University. This marked the first new host venue on a college campus since the first appearance of Thompson–Boling Arena in 1990, and the first host city to debut on a college campus since Boise in 1983. The tournament returned to Nashville at the then-four-year-old Gaylord Entertainment Center downtown, with previous tournaments having been hosted in Memorial Gym on the campus of Vanderbilt University. And for the first time since 1954, the tournament returned to Buffalo, at the HSBC Arena (now KeyBank Center). The first round tournament games coincided with the date of the arena's name change; previously it had been known as Marine Midland Arena. For the fifth, and  most recent, time, both the Huntsman Center and McKale Center were chosen as the two first and second round hosts of the West regionals. All 13 venues have gone on to host more tournament games since this season. Any future tournament games to be held in Cleveland would be played at Rocket Mortgage FieldHouse; if in Salt Lake City, Vivint Arena.

Teams

Bids by conference

Final Four
At RCA Dome, Indianapolis, Indiana

National semifinals
April 1, Michigan State (M1) 53, Wisconsin (W8) 41
In the first half it appeared that the Cinderella run of the Wisconsin Badgers had a great chance of continuing. Wisconsin's slow down offense, smothering defense tempo held the game to a Michigan State Spartans 19–17 lead. However, the only number one seed left in the tournament opened the second half with a 13–2 run, including 10 points from senior Morris Peterson. After the run, Michigan State coasted home against Wisconsin's limited offense.
Florida (E5) 71, North Carolina (S8) 59
Despite being behind 18–3 to start the game and trailing at halftime, the North Carolina Tar Heels took control of the early minutes of the second half, and managed to sneak ahead 48–42 on standout freshman guard Joseph Forte's second consecutive three-pointer with 15:44 to play. However, the Florida Gators answered back with a 9–0 run to give them the lead for good. The Gators held the Tar Heels to just six points over a 9 minute span to put them in great shape. Foul trouble ultimately doomed the Tar Heels, and the Gators advanced to their first ever National Championship game.

Championship game

April 3, 2000
Michigan State (M1) 89, Florida (E5) 76
Michigan State senior Mateen Cleaves limped his way to the Most Outstanding Player (MOP) of the 2000 NCAA Tournament. Cleaves sprained his ankle with 16:18 to play in the 2nd half, and this was after Florida had trimmed Michigan State's double digit halftime lead to 50–44. Cleaves returned about four minutes later, and immediately helped lead the Spartans on a 16–6 run to put the game out of reach. The lone top-seed remaining would bring order to a tournament filled with upsets as they salted away the victory for the school's second National Championship (1979). Michigan State coach Tom Izzo earned his first title, from his second straight final four appearance. Morris Peterson led the Spartans with 21 points.

Bracket
* – Denotes overtime period

East Regional – Syracuse, New York

Southeast Regional – Austin, Texas

Midwest Regional – Auburn Hills, Michigan

West Regional – Albuquerque, New Mexico

Final Four at Indianapolis, Indiana

Broadcast information

Television
CBS Sports had exclusive TV coverage.  They were carried on a regional basis until the "Elite Eight", at which point all games were shown nationally.

Jim Nantz/Billy Packer/Bonnie Bernstein – First & Second Round at Winston-Salem, North Carolina; East Regional at Syracuse, New York; Final Four at Indianapolis, Indiana
Verne Lundquist/Bill Raftery/Armen Keteyian – First & Second Round at Minneapolis, Minnesota; Midwest Regional at Auburn Hills, Michigan
Dick Enberg/James Worthy/Spencer Tillman – First & Second Round at Birmingham, Alabama; South Regional at Austin, Texas
Gus Johnson and Dan Bonner – First & Second Round at Tucson, Arizona; West Regional at Albuquerque, New Mexico
Kevin Harlan and Jon Sundvold – First & Second Round at Cleveland, Ohio
Ian Eagle/Jim Spanarkel/Dwayne Ballen – First & Second Round at Buffalo, New York
Tim Brando and Rolando Blackman – First & Second Round at Nashville, Tennessee
Craig Bolerjack and Barry Booker – First & Second Round at Salt Lake City, Utah

Greg Gumbel once again served as the studio host, joined by analyst Clark Kellogg.

Radio
Westwood One had exclusive radio coverage.

Tommy Tighe once again served as studio host.

Local radio

See also
 2000 NCAA Division II men's basketball tournament
 2000 NCAA Division III men's basketball tournament
 2000 NCAA Division I women's basketball tournament
 2000 NCAA Division II women's basketball tournament
 2000 NCAA Division III women's basketball tournament
 2000 National Invitation Tournament
 2000 Women's National Invitation Tournament
 2000 NAIA Division I men's basketball tournament
 2000 NAIA Division II men's basketball tournament
 2000 NAIA Division I women's basketball tournament
 2000 NAIA Division II women's basketball tournament

References

NCAA Division I men's basketball tournament
Ncaa
NCAA Division I men's basketball tournament
NCAA Division I men's basketball tournament
NCAA Division I men's basketball tournament
NCAA
NCAA